ProQR Therapeutics NV (NASDAQ: PRQR) is a Dutch biotechnology company based in Leiden, the Netherlands. The company was funded in 2012 by chief executive officer (CEO) Daniel de Boer. It specializes in the development of RNA therapeutics for rare genetic diseases with an ophthalmologic application.

History
ProQR was founded in 2012 by chief executive officer (CEO) Daniel de Boer and co-founders Henri Termeer, Dinko Valerio and Gerard Platenburg. 

The initial pipeline of the company was to develop small-molecule drugs or gene therapy that would treat cystic fibrosis (CF). Positive proof of concept (PoC) was achieved in 2016 with the clinical trial of the molecule QR-010 targeting the gene coding for cystic fibrosis transmembrane conductance regulator (CFTCR) in patients. Subsequently, the company expanded its pipeline into treating other rare diseases.

In 2017, a spin-out of ProQR named Amylon Therapeutics was established in Leiden with the focus on the development of therapies for the central nervous system.

In 2021, ProQR announced a collaboration with Eli Lilly and Company on the Axiomer technology focused on "genetic disorders in the liver and nervous system". They signed a deal with which ProQR would receive $50 million ($20 million upfront) and an equity investment of $30 million.  The relationship between the two firms "deepened" in 2022 with expansion of the indications engagement and a $75 million cash infusion which included an equity stake.

Projects
The company’s current pipeline includes potential treatments for rare genetic diseases including Leber's congenital amaurosis, (LCA10) dystrophic epidermolysis bullosa, retinitis pigmentosa and Usher syndrome. 

ProQR is an RNA editing company targeting genetic diseases by focusing on making changes to the RNA. The firm's RNA editing technology, called Axiomer can make targeted single nucleotide changes to RNA. The company's ultimate goal revolves around treating inherited retinal diseases by stopping and potentially reversing vision loss. In addition to its headquarters in  Leiden, the company is also active in Cambridge, Massachusetts.

Drugs developed
One of the company’s lead candidates, QR-110, is being developed to treat LCA10. The substance acts by binding the mutated RNA region which will allow the formation of a normal CEP290 protein.

See also

List of pharmaceutical companies
List of companies of the Netherlands

References

External links
 

Biotechnology companies of the Netherlands
Companies based in South Holland
Biotechnology companies established in 2012
2012 establishments in the Netherlands